Pârâul Morii may refer to:

 Pârâul Morii, a tributary of the Șes in Caraș-Severin County
 Pârâul Morii (Ier), a tributary of the Ier in Satu Mare County